The Japanese silver-biddy (Gerres equulus) is a species of mojarra native to the coastal waters of the western Pacific Ocean from southern Korea to southern Japan, though it does not occur around the Ryukyu Islands.  This species can reach  in standard length. It is commercially important for the local fish industry in Japan.

Reproduction
G. equulus is a multiple spawner.  Its spawning season is continuous from June to September. The female gains sexual maturity at a minimum of 141 mm long.

See also
Common silver-biddy

References

Japanese silver biddy
Fish of Japan
Fish described in 1844